The Kuwait Naval Force (Arabic: القوة البحرية الكويتية romanized: Al-Quwwat Al-Bahriyah Al-Kuwaitiyah), is the sea-based component of the  Kuwait Armed Forces. The headquarters and sole naval base is Mohammed Al-Ahmad Kuwait Naval Base. The Kuwait Naval Force  consists of over 2,200 officers and enlisted personnel, excluding about 500 coast guard personnel. The Coast Guard, a Border Security Directorate of  the Kuwait Ministry of Interior.

History 
Kuwait's navy was established in 1961 shortly after Britain ended the country's protectorate status following Operation Vantage.

During the Invasion of Kuwait and Operation Desert Storm, Kuwait's navy was almost completely destroyed. At the start of the invasion, the Iraqi Navy captured and sank five Kuwaiti Lürssen TNC-45 type fast attack craft (missile) and one Lürssen FPB-57 type fast attack craft (missile). Kuwait Naval Forces also lost 20 other ships to Iraq during the war.

On 11 November 2008, Kuwait Naval Base was the location of the historic signing of the non-legally binding maritime Khawr Abd Allah Protocols otherwise known as the KAA Protocols. The signing of the KAA Protocols by the then respective heads of the Kuwaiti Naval Force and the Iraqi Navy was the first formal and successful maritime bilateral military agreement for the co-ordinated and de-conflicted use of the Khawr Abd Allah waterway since before the 1991 Persian Gulf War. The protocols were developed and mediated by Major David Hammond RM, a British Royal Navy barrister in 2008 and they were subsequently ratified by both the Kuwaiti and Iraqi governments before the 11 November 2008 signing. They were subsequently reported to the US Congress within the December 2008 'Measuring Stability and Security in Iraq' report and the text of which have since become public knowledge following leaks in US diplomatic notes.

Structure and Organization 
 Kuwait Naval Warships
 Kuwait Marine Corps
 Kuwait Commando Marine Units

Part of the present fleet

List Missile Fast Patrol Boats (MFPB)

List Patrol Fighting Vessels

List Amphibious Vessels and Landing Craft

List Supply Vessels

Future ships 
 1 DSV (Diving Support Vessel)

Landing craft, the procurement programme for the Kuwait Navy included the acquisition of two 64 m landing craft, one 42 m landing craft and five 16 m composite landing craft; all will be built at ADSB’s facilities in the Mussafah industrial area (UAE) all delivered except one 64 m landing craft to be delivered in 2017.

See also 
 Chief of the General Staff (Kuwait)
 Ministry of Defense (Kuwait)

Notes

References 
 Article on Kuwaiti Military
 Globalsecurity.org report on the Iraqi navy
 Ships of the Kuwait Navy, past and present
 Um Al Marradim Class description
 Summary of Kuwait military power
 Measuring Stability and Security in Iraq

External links 
 UNIKOM

 Kuwait Navy buys gun system from Rheinmetall
 

Military of Kuwait
Military units and formations established in 1961